Almquist is a surname. Notable people with the surname include:

 Ansgar Almquist (1889–1973), Swedish sculptor
Bengt Idestam-Almquist (1895–1983), Swedish screenwriter
Carl Almquist (1848–1924), Swedish stained-glass artist who worked in Britain
 Don Almquist (born 1929), American painter and illustrator
 Erik Viktor Almquist (1817–1872), Swedish politician
Harold V. Almquist (1904–1994), American football, basketball, and baseball player and coach
 Theodore C. Almquist (1941–2010), American Air Force Brigadier General

See also 
 Almquist shell, a command-line interpreter used by the Unix computer operating system
 Almqvist